

Sources 
 

Buildings and structures in Hainan
Hainan